Aircraft of the French Air Force and Naval Aviation during the Phoney War and the Battle of France, and aircraft of the Free French Air Force (FAFL).

The list is not complete and includes obsolete aircraft used for training as well as prototype and pre-production aircraft.

List is in alphabetical order by manufacturer or designer.

Amiot
 Amiot 143 medium bomber
 Amiot 351/Amiot 354 twin-engine light bomber

ANF Les Mureaux
 ANF Les Mureaux 113/115/117 reconnaissance aircraft

Arsenal
 Arsenal VG-33 light wooden-built fighter for rapid production, only few built and used.

Besson
 MB.411 submarine-borne floatplane operated by French submarine Surcouf

Blériot-SPAD
 Blériot-SPAD S.510 biplane fighter, mostly used for training by the time of the beginning of the war.

Bloch
  MB.81 transport
 MB.131 reconnaissance/bomber
 MB.150 series fighters
 MB.150 1936 prototype
  MB.151 first production variant, 140 built
 MB.152 increased power, 430 built
 MB.155 improved aerodynamics, at least 45 built
 MB.162 long-range heavy bomber
 MB.174 reconnaissance
 MB.175 bomber
 MB.200 bomber
 MB.210 bomber
 MB.220 transport
 MB.700 prototype light fighter, one completed

Breguet

 Bre.270 observation
 Bre.482 heavy bomber, single complete prototype destroyed in German air raid in 1942
 Bre.521 "Bizerte" - flying boat
 Bre.691 twin engine light ground attack bomber
 Bre.693 Bre.691 with different engines
 Bre.695 Bre.693 with larger engines

CAMS
 CAMS 37 ship-borne flying boat
 CAMS 55 maritime reconnaissance flying boat

Caproni (Italian)
 Caproni Ca.164 trainer
 Caproni Ca.313 bomber

Caudron
 C.272 Luciole liaison
 C.400 Phalène liaison
 C.445 Goeland liaison/transport
 C.600 Aiglon liaison
 C.630 Simoun transport
 C.714 Cyclone light fighter

Curtiss (American)
 H-75 fighter
 CW-77 dive bomber

de Havilland (British)
 DH.82 Tiger Moth trainer
 DH.89 Dragon Rapide transport

Dewoitine
 Dewoitine D.338 transport
 D.500/D.501/D.510 fighter
 D.520 fighter
 D.720 reconnaissance
 HD.730 reconnaissance floatplane

Douglas
 DB-7 bomber

Farman/SNCAC
 F.190 transport
 F.222 heavy bomber/transport
 F.223 heavy bomber
 F.224 transport
 F.402 transport and observation
 NC.150 high altitude bomber prototype
 NC.223 heavy bomber
 NC.410 floatplane prototype
 NC.470 trainer
 NC-600  twin-engine fighter prototype

Gourdou-Leseurre
 GL-812 HY ship-borne observation floatplane
 GL-813 HY ship-borne observation floatplane
 GL-832 HY ship-borne observation floatplane

Hanriot
 H.436 trainer
 H.16 liaison
 H.185 liaison
 H.232 advanced trainer
 H.180 trainer
 H.220 fighter-bomber
 H.230 trainer
 H.510 observation

Koolhoven (Netherlands)
 FK.58 fighter, about 13 pressed into action in May 1940

Latécoère
  Laté.298 torpedo bomber floatplane
 Laté.299 reconnaissance/torpedo bomber landplane
 Laté.302 long range flying boat
 Laté.381 long range flying boat
 Laté.523 long range flying boat
 Laté.570 bomber
 Laté.611 long range flying boat
 Laté.631 long range flying boat

Levasseur
 PL.10 torpedo bomber
 PL.101 torpedo bomber
 PL.14 torpedo bomber floatplane
 PL.15 torpedo bomber floatplane

Lioré et Olivier
 LeO C.30 Cierva observation autogyro
 LeO H-43 observation float plane
 Lioré et Olivier LeO.206 biplane heavy night bomber
 LeO H-246 flying boat
 LeO H-257 torpedo bomber/bomber float plane
 LeO.451 bomber
 LeO H-470 flying boat

Loire 
 Loire 46 fighter
 Loire 501 liaison
 Loire 70 flying boat
 Loire 130 flying boat
 Loire 210 ship-borne fighter floatplane

Loire-Nieuport
 LN.401 ship-borne dive bomber
 LN.411 ship-borne dive bomber

SFCA Maillet
 Maillet 201 liaison

Martin (American)
 M.167 bomber

Mauboussin
  Mauboussin M.123 trainer

Morane-Saulnier
 MS.225 fighter
 MS.230 trainer
  MS.315 trainer
 MS.406 fighter

Nardi (Italian)
 Nardi FN.305 trainer/liaison

Nieuport-Delage
 NiD.622 fighter
 NiD.629 fighter

North American (American)
 NAA-57 trainer/reconnaissance 
 NAA-64 trainer/reconnaissance

Potez
 Potez 25 observation
 Potez 29 transport
 Potez 33 liaison
 Potez 39 observation
 Potez 230 light fighter prototype
 Potez 402 transport
 Potez 452 ship-borne flying boat
 Potez 542 bomber/reconnaissance
 Potez 56 trainer/transport
 Potez 585 liaison
 Potez 63 series, fighter, light bomber/reconnaissance (1200+ built)
 Potez 630  fighter/trainer
 Potez 631  day/night twin-engine fighter (215 built)
 Potez 633  light bomber
 Potez 637  reconnaissance
 Potez 63.11 observation/reconnaissance (900+ built)
 Potez 650 transport
 Potez 662 transport
 Potez-CAMS 141 flying boat

Romano/SNCASE
 R.82 trainer

Roussel
 Roussel R-30 light fighter-bomber prototype

Salmson
 Salmson Cricri elementary trainer
 Salmson Phrygane liaison

SNCAO
 CAO.200 fighter
 CAO.30 flying boat trainer
 CAO.600 torpedo bomber

SNCASE
 SE.100 twin engine fighter
 SE.200 transport flying boat
 SE.400 patrol floatplane

Vought (American)
 V.156 carrier-borne dive bomber

Wibault-Penhoët
 Wibault 283T transport
 Wibault 360T transport

Aircraft of the Free French Air Forces, 1940-1945

Airspeed Oxford Mk.II trainer
Amiot 143M bomber
Avro Anson bomber/trainer
Avro York VIP transport
Beechcraft Model 18 liaison/trainer
Bell P-39N/Q fighter
Bell P-63A Kingcobra fighter
Bloch MB.81 liaison
Bloch MB.131 bomber
Bloch MB.174 reconnaissance
Bloch MB.175 bomber
Boeing B-17 Flying Fortress transport
Bristol Blenheim Mk.IV & Mk.V light bomber
CANT Z.1007 Alcione transport
Caudron C.270 Luciole liaison
Caudron C.400 Phalène liaison
Caudron C.445 Goeland transport
Caudron C.600 Aiglon liaison
Caudron C.630 Simoun trainer
Cessna UC-78 Bobcat liaison
Consolidated PBY Catalina patrol bomber
Cunliffe-Owen OA.1 transport
Curtiss Hawk 75 fighter
Curtiss P-40E/F/N fighter
de Havilland DH.80 Puss Moth liaison
de Havilland DH.82 Tiger Moth trainer
Dewoitine D.520 fighter
Douglas SBD Dauntless/A-24 bomber
Douglas DB-7 medium bomber
Douglas Boston medium bomber
Farman F.220 transport
Handley Page Halifax heavy bomber
Hawker Hurricane Mk.I/Mk.IIB fighter
Howard DGA-15 liaison
Lioré et Olivier LeO 451 transport
Lockheed Model 12 Electra Junior transport
Lockheed Model 18 Lodestar transport
Lockheed Hudson patrol bomber
Lockheed F-4/F-5 Lightning photo reconnaissance
Lockheed PV-1 Ventura patrol bomber
Martin 167 bomber/liaison
Martin 187 Baltimore bomber
Martin B-26B/G Marauder medium bomber
Morane-Saulnier M.S.230 trainer
Morane-Saulnier M.S.315 trainer
Morane-Saulnier M.S.406 fighter
North American NAA-57 trainer
North American B-25C/H Mitchell medium bomber
North American F-6C Mustang photo reconnaissance
Piper L-4 observation
Polikarpov Po-2 liaison
Potez 25 trainer
Potez 29 transport
Potez 540 liaison
Potez 631 reconnaissance
Potez 63.11 reconnaissance/bomber
Potez 650 transport
Republic P-47D Thunderbolt fighter-bomber
Supermarine Spitfire fighter
Supermarine Walrus rescue amphibian
Universal L-7 liaison
Stinson Reliant liaison/training
Stinson 105 Voyager liaison
Vultee BT-13 Valiant trainer
Vultee A-35 Vengeance dive bomber
Vickers Wellington maritime patrol
Westland Lysander Mk.III liaison
Yakovlev Yak-1 & 1M fighter
Yakovlev Yak-3 fighter
Yakovlev Yak-7B fighter
Yakovlev Yak-9 & 9T fighter

See also

 List of aircraft of World War II
 List of military aircraft of France
 List of Regia Aeronautica aircraft used in World War II
 List of aircraft of the Luftwaffe, World War II
 List of aircraft of the U.S. military, World War II
 List of aircraft of the Royal Air Force

References

Citations

Bibliography
 
 

World War II French aircraft
Aircraft
France